Asianet News is an Indian Malayalam language free to air news channel. owned by Jupiter Entertainment Ventures (Jupiter Capital Ventures). The channel is based in Thiruvananthapuram, Kerala. Asianet News is currently one of the market leaders in the Malayalam television news sector.

Frank P. Thomas is the Director and Group CFO of Asianet News Network (ANN),Manoj K Das is the current Managing Editor of Asianet News Malayalam Network and Kaushik Ghosh is the Chief Revenue Officer of Asianet News Network (ANN). Rajesh Kalra is the Executive Chairman of Asianet News Network (ANN). Rajeev Chandrasekhar, a Bharatiya Janata Party Member of Parliament in the Council of States from Karnataka, is the chairman of Jupiter Capital. The company also owns the Kannada news channel Asianet Suvarna News and is an investor in English news channel Republic TV.

Malayalam general entertainment channels, Asianet, Asianet Plus, and Asianet Movies, are owned by The Walt Disney Company India. wholly owned by The Walt Disney Company. Asianet Digital Network are wholly owned by Asianet Satellite Communications (Cable television, Broadband & Teleshopping, Consumer Electronics, OTT, Pay television & Broadcasting) Telecommunications Company. And Asianet News Network channels, Asianet Satellite Communications Telecommunications Company, Disney Star Asianet (previously known as Asianet Star communications) use that channel's name and logo.

History 
The Asianet channel company and Asianet cable company were promoted by Sashi Kumar with seed capital provided by Reji Menon. Kumar was a former head of Press Trust of India's television division and his relative Menon was a Moscow-based businessman. Asianet Communications was the first entertainment television company in Malayalam.

Origins 
Asianet Communications was toying with the idea of a news channel - there was none in Malayalam - for a long time. It was with this intention that Asianet Global - their second channel - was launched in June 2001. The channel was targeting the huge expatriate Malayali population in the Middle East and Europe. However, as it turned out, there were very few news-based programmes in the channel and most of it later gave way to film-based entertainment programmes.

With Asianet Global not fetching returns, the management decided to go in for an entertainment channel called "Asianet Plus" and terminate Asianet Global. Midway through the launching and wind up process, there was a rethink and the concept of a news channel was revived. It was initially reported in the media that the a news channel will be launched by December 2002. The channel was expected have news programmes in the evenings after which there would be a variety of entertainment programmes. Hourly news bulletins were also expected. Asianet Global was eventually renamed as "Asianet News" on 1 May 2003. Company MD K. Madhavan told the media that the entire channel had also been restructured in the process.

Exit of Sashi Kumar 
When Asianet channel company and Asianet cable company faced a financial crunch, the real estate firm Rahejas was given 50% stake in the cable operations. The channels were still owned by Sashi Kumar (50% shares) and Reji Menon (50% shares). The Rahejas later wanted a stake in the channel operations too. While Kumar resisted overtures from the Rahejas, Menon negotiated a deal with them, and under the deal, the Rahejas got full control over the cable company. Menon used the consideration the Rahejas paid him to provide Kumar a "golden handshake".

According to media reports, Sashi Kumar's exit from Asianet created a sense of loss in the Communist Party of India-Marxist leadership in Kerala. The party soon started promoting a company to set up an alternative Malayalam channel.

Afterwards an attempt by Zee Group to acquire Asianet from Menon fell through. This was apparently because the severance agreement with the cable company prohibits the channel's takeover by a company with interest in cable operations.

Rajiv Chandrasekhar era 
It was in February–April 2006 the first speculations about Rajeev Chandrasekhar's interest in Asianet broke out. Chandrasekhar was a Bangalore-based businessman of Kerala origin. In late 2006 Menon - after months long speculations - partially pulled out of Asianet turning over control to Chandrasekhar. At the time, Asianet was the leader amongst the Malayalam channels accounting for 35% of Kerala's total advertisement market.

Chandrasekhar had acquired a 51% stake in the Asianet channels (Asianet, Asianet News, and Asianet Plus) through Jupiter Entertainment Ventures (JEV) in October 2006. While there was no official word from Asianet on the size of the investment, the figure is thought to range between INR 120-150 crore. The remaining 49% stake was still held by Menon and Asianet MD K. Madhavan with Zee Group holding a small 3% stake. Madhavan continued as the MD of Asianet, while Chandrasekhar took over as the Chairman of the company. Asianet Communications soon launched its foray into Kannada and Telugu television industry with Asianet Suvarna and Asianet Sitara.

STAR India acquisitions 
Asianet was restructured into four companies in June 2008 (general entertainment, news, radio and media infrastructure). This move was to allow separate investments in each company. STAR India started talks with the owners of the Asianet channels in August 2008. While the negotiations were going on, the CPI-Marxist leadership in Kerala famously called for "a revolt against the entry of media mogul Rupert Murdoch's STAR TV network into the [Kerala] state". The party called the move a "cultural invasion".

STAR India eventually bought a 51% stake in Asianet Communications and formed joint venture with JEV in November 2008. The joint venture, called "STAR Jupiter", comprised all general entertainment channels of Asianet Communications (Asianet, Asianet Plus, Asianet Suvarna and Asianet Sitara)  and Star Vijay. Star India had reportedly paid $235 million in cash for the 51% stake and assumed net debt of approximately $20 million.  It’s not clear how much stake Menon held in the new STAR Jupiter venture. Prior to forming the JV, it was known that the original founder had held about 26% stake. In the wake of media reports about the STAR takeover, Asianet Vice-Chairman Madhavan issued a media release saying: "There is no basis for the speculation that the policies of the Asianet News Network (ANN) will fall under foreign [STAR]  control".

STAR India increased its stake in Asianet Communications to 75% in July 2010 (for which STAR India paid around $90 million in cash), and to 87%, by acquiring 12% stake for $160 million in June 2013. The later move was by virtue of acquiring a 19% equity stake in Vijay TV from Chandrasekhar and Asianet Communications MD Madhavan. Following the June 2013 investment, Asianet Communications was valued at $1.33 billion. STAR India acquired 100% stake in Asianet Communications (buying the remaining 13% stake) in March 2014.

Attempts on editorial freedom 
In October 2016 Jupiter Capital was accused by the media of interfering with editorial freedom. The accusation was triggered by a leaked email sent from Jupiter Capital Chief Operating Officer Amit Gupta to editorial heads of Asianet News, Suvarna News, and Kannada Prabha. M. G. Radhakrishnan, Editor-in-Chief of Asianet News, told the media he was not aware of the email and that he had "never faced pressure of any kind from the management".

Chandrasekhar was one of the largest investors in ARG Outlier Asianet News, the parent company of the English-language news channel Republic TV.  Chandrasekhar, through Asianet, had invested over INR 30 crore in ARG Outlier. SARG Media Holding - owned by Arnab Goswami - is other major investor in ARG Outlier Asianet News. In May 2019, Asianet diluted its shareholding in The Republic Media Network by selling a large amount its shares to Goswami. Currently, Asianet is a minority investor in Republic TV.

Security issues and ban 

On 6 March 2020, the Information and Broadcasting Ministry suspended the broadcast of Asianet News and MediaOne TV for two days over their coverage of the 2020 Delhi riots. The ministry accused the two channels of "being biased and critical of the Rashtriya Swayamsevak Sangh and the Delhi Police". Citing a report of P. R. Sunil, the government said the coverage was done in a manner "which highlighted the attack on places of worship and siding towards a particular community". The ban on Asianet News was eventually revoked at 1.30 am (8 March).

Editorial freedom 

Asianet News and Suvarna News are currently run by Asianet News Network (ANN). ANN operates as a subsidiary of Jupiter Entertainment Ventures (JEV), a subsidiary of Jupiter Capital Ventures. As per the media critics, Asianet News enjoys a good "reputation" among the news channels in Malayalam. It is often described as "a widely trusted" brand and "top player" in the Malayalam media space.

According to Jacob George, a prominent commentator, Asianet News has had a "secular and progressive stance" since the time of its inception in 2003. In his opinion, the current editorial leadership at the news channel is "not easily malleable" and has "immense credibility". According to the Caravan magazine, Asianet News, is "by wide consensus, the most popular and credible news channel in Kerala".

Recruiting guideline Email 
Media watchdog Newslaundry exposed an e-mail from Amit Gupta, the Chief Operating Officer of Jupiter Capital, to the editorial heads of Asianet News and Suvarna News, in October 2016. The internal e-mail was sent in September, 2016 as a 'guideline' to look up while recruiting new editors.

Jupiter Capital, according to the Email, wanted their new editors to be "right of centre in his/her editorial tonality" and "well familiarised with his (Rajeev Chandrasekhar's) thoughts on nationalism and governance". The letter explicitly said that the fresh "editorial talent should be aligned to Rajeev Chandrasekhar's ideology"(Rajeev Chandrasekhar is an MP of BJP)

Amit Gupta, on the very next day, had to retract the email because of internal editorial pushback.

Channels and web portals

References

External links 
 
 The Caravan (March, 2020)
 The Caravan (December, 2017)

Television stations in Thiruvananthapuram
Malayalam-language television channels
Television channels and stations established in 2003
Television channels and stations established in 2001
2003 establishments in Kerala
Indian news websites